Edwin Stiven Mosquera Palacios (born 27 June 2001) is a Colombian professional footballer who plays as a winger for Argentine Primera División club Defensa y Justicia, on loan from Major League Soccer club Atlanta United.

Career

Atlanta United
On 12 July 2022, Mosquera signed a four-year deal with Major League Soccer club Atlanta United for an undisclosed transfer fee.

References

External links

2001 births
Living people
People from Quibdó
Colombian footballers
Association football midfielders
Colombian expatriate footballers
Expatriate soccer players in the United States
Colombian expatriate sportspeople in the United States
Categoría Primera A players
Campeonato Brasileiro Série A players
Argentine Primera División players
Independiente Medellín footballers
Esporte Clube Juventude players
Aldosivi footballers
Atlanta United FC players
Major League Soccer players